GP Gorenjska, known as GP Slovenia in 2021, is an annual single-day road cycling race in Slovenia. The race is organized as a 1.2 event on the UCI Europe Tour.

Winners

References

Cycle races in Slovenia
2021 establishments in Slovenia
Recurring sporting events established in 2021
UCI Europe Tour races